Hugh Walley was a footballer who played as a left winger for Burslem Port Vale and Burton Swifts in the 1900s.

Career
Walley joined Burslem Port Vale as an amateur in August 1905. He made his debut the following month at outside-left in a 2–2 draw with Grimsby Town at the Athletic Ground on 16 September. He played nine Second Division games in the 1905–06 season, and scored his first goal in the Football League on 21 April, in a 2–1 win over Bradford City. He played one game in the 1906–07 campaign and was released, probably in 1907.

Career statistics
Source:

References

English footballers
Association football wingers
Port Vale F.C. players
Burton Swifts F.C. players
English Football League players
Year of birth missing
Year of death missing